Plymouth, Sutton was, from 1918 until 2010, a borough constituency represented in the House of Commons of the Parliament of the United Kingdom.  It elected one Member of Parliament (MP) by the first past the post system of election.

History
Plymouth Sutton covered parts of the city of Plymouth, in South West England, and was first contested at the 1918 general election.  In a by-election in 1919, it became the second constituency in the UK (and the first in Great Britain) to elect a female MP: Nancy Astor became the first woman to take a seat in the House of Commons (the first female MP was the Sinn Féin member Constance Markievicz, who did not take her seat). Three of its MPs have been members of the Astor family. A more recent prominent MP was the flamboyant Conservative Alan Clark, who represented Plymouth Sutton from 1974 until 1992.

Abolition
Following the Fifth Periodic Review of Westminster constituencies by the Boundary Commission for England, constituencies in Plymouth were reorganised, with both Plymouth Sutton and Plymouth Devonport being replaced by new constituencies of Plymouth Sutton and Devonport and Plymouth Moor View from 2010. The vast majority of the Plymouth Sutton constituency became part of the new Plymouth Sutton and Devonport constituency.

Boundaries
1918–1950: The County Borough of Plymouth wards of Charles, Compton, Friary, Laira, St Andrew, Sutton, and Vintry.

1950–1955: The County Borough of Plymouth wards of Charles, Compton, Crownhill, Drake, Friary, Laira, Mutley, St Andrew, Sutton, Valletort, and Vintry, and the parish of Bickleigh in the Rural District of Plympton St Mary.

1955–1974: The County Borough of Plymouth wards of Charles, Compton, Crownhill, Efford, Friary, Mount Gould, Peverell, Sutton, Tamerton, and Trelawney.

1974–1983: The County Borough of Plymouth wards of Crownhill, Efford, Mount Gould, Plympton Erle, Plympton St Mary, Plymstock Dunstone, Plymstock Radford, and Sutton.

1983–1997: The City of Plymouth wards of Efford, Eggbuckland, Mount Gould, Plympton Erle, Plympton St Mary, Plymstock Dunstone, and Plymstock Radford.

1997–2010: The City of Plymouth wards of Compton, Drake, Efford, Mount Gould, St Peter, Stoke, Sutton, and Trelawny.

The 1997 boundary changes were highly favourable to Labour in this constituency: what had been a safe Conservative seat became a marginal seat. As such the seat from 1997 until 2010 was closer in its wards to the defunct marginal seat of Plymouth Drake.

Members of Parliament

Elections

Elections in the 1910s

Elections in the 1920s

Elections in the 1930s 

General Election 1939–40:
Another General Election was required to take place before the end of 1940. The political parties had been making preparations for an election to take place and by the Autumn of 1939, the following candidates had been selected; 
Conservative: Nancy Astor
Labour: Lucy Middleton

Elections in the 1940s

Elections in the 1950s

Elections in the 1960s

Elections in the 1970s

New constituency boundaries came into effect in time for the following election in February 1974.

Elections in the 1980s

Elections in the 1990s

Elections in the 2000s

See also 
 List of parliamentary constituencies in Devon

Notes and references

Sources
 

Constituencies of the Parliament of the United Kingdom established in 1918
Constituencies of the Parliament of the United Kingdom disestablished in 2010
Parliamentary constituencies in Devon (historic)
Politics of Plymouth, Devon